Arctostaphylos otayensis is a species of manzanita known by the common name Otay manzanita. This shrub is endemic to California, where it is native to the mountains of San Diego County.

Description
It is an erect shrub, reaching up to 2.5 meters in height. It has shreddy red bark that grows gray with age. It has smooth oval-shaped pointed leaves and dense inflorescences of flowers. The tightly bunched flowers are pale pink highlighted with bright magenta. The fruit is a red drupe between one half and one centimeter wide.

References

External links
 
 
Jepson Manual Treatment
USDA Plants Profile
Photo gallery

otayensis
Endemic flora of California
Natural history of the California chaparral and woodlands
Natural history of the Peninsular Ranges
Natural history of San Diego County, California